Valparaiso station was a train station in Valparaiso, Indiana. Initially served by the Pennsylvania Railroad, it was the outbound terminus of the Amtrak Calumet until that service's discontinuance in 1991.

Amtrak began service here on April 25, 1976, as a stop of the Capitol Limited. The original station building was destroyed in a fire and replaced with a small shelter.

References

Former Pennsylvania Railroad stations
Former Amtrak stations in Indiana
Railway stations closed in 1991
Railway stations in Porter County, Indiana
Buildings and structures in Valparaiso, Indiana
Demolished railway stations in the United States